Alfonso Daniel Barco Del Solar (born 7 December 2001) is a Peruvian footballer who plays as a midfielder for Peruvian Primera División side Universitario de Deportes.

Club career

Universidad San Martín
Barco took his first steps in football in Sporting Cristal, before joining Universidad San Martín in 2018, where he shortly after became an established player on the club's reserve team. He got his official debut in the Peruvian Primera División for San Martín on 10 June 2019 against Ayacucho FC. 

Shortly after, in July 2019, he was loaned to César Vallejo for the rest of the year to gain some experience. However, he was never used on the first team but became a key player on the club's reserve team, being one of the players who played the most minutes.

Barco was officially promoted to the club's first team for the 2020 season when he returned from his loan spell. On 3 December 2021 Universitario de Deportes confirmed, that Barco would join the club from the 2022 season on a deal until the end of 2023.

Personal life
Alfonso Barco is the son of former professional footballer, Alvaro Barco, and nephew of José del Solar.

References

External links
 
 

Living people
2001 births
Association football midfielders
Peruvian footballers
Peru youth international footballers
Peruvian Primera División players
Club Deportivo Universidad de San Martín de Porres players
Club Deportivo Universidad César Vallejo footballers
Club Universitario de Deportes footballers